Chou Tien-chen (born 8 January 1990) is a Taiwanese badminton player. He became the first local shuttler in 17 years to win the men's singles title of the Chinese Taipei Open in 2016 since Indonesian-born Fung Permadi won it in 1999. He won his first BWF Super Series title at the 2014 French Open, beating Wang Zhengming of China 10–21, 25–23, 21–19 in the finals. He is the record holder of  three consecutive Bitburger Open Grand Prix Gold titles from 2012 till 2014.

Achievements

BWF World Championships 
Men's singles

Asian Games 
Men's singles

Asian Championships 
Men's singles

Summer Universiade 
Men's singles

Asian Junior Championships 
Mixed doubles

BWF World Tour (7 titles, 10 runners-up) 
The BWF World Tour, which was announced on 19 March 2017 and implemented in 2018, is a series of elite badminton tournaments sanctioned by the Badminton World Federation (BWF). The BWF World Tour is divided into levels of World Tour Finals, Super 1000, Super 750, Super 500, Super 300, and the BWF Tour Super 100.

Men's singles

BWF Superseries (1 title, 2 runners-up) 
The BWF Superseries, which was launched on 14 December 2006 and implemented in 2007, was a series of elite badminton tournaments, sanctioned by the Badminton World Federation (BWF). BWF Superseries levels were Superseries and Superseries Premier. A season of Superseries consisted of twelve tournaments around the world that had been introduced since 2011. Successful players were invited to the Superseries Finals, which were held at the end of each year.

Men's singles

  BWF Superseries Finals tournament
  BWF Superseries Premier tournament
  BWF Superseries tournament

BWF Grand Prix (7 titles, 6 runners-up) 
The BWF Grand Prix had two levels, the Grand Prix and Grand Prix Gold. It was a series of badminton tournaments sanctioned by the Badminton World Federation (BWF) and played between 2007 and 2017.

Men's singles

  BWF Grand Prix Gold tournament
  BWF Grand Prix tournament

BWF International Challenge/Series (4 titles) 
Men's singles

Mixed doubles

  BWF International Challenge tournament
  BWF International Series tournament

Record against selected opponents 
Record against Year-end Finals finalists, World Championships semi-finalists, and Olympic quarter-finalists. Accurate as of 10 December 2022.

References

External links 
 
 

1990 births
Living people
Sportspeople from Taipei
Taiwanese male badminton players
Badminton players at the 2016 Summer Olympics
Badminton players at the 2020 Summer Olympics
Olympic badminton players of Taiwan
Badminton players at the 2010 Asian Games
Badminton players at the 2014 Asian Games
Badminton players at the 2018 Asian Games
Asian Games silver medalists for Chinese Taipei
Asian Games bronze medalists for Chinese Taipei
Asian Games medalists in badminton
Medalists at the 2014 Asian Games
Medalists at the 2018 Asian Games
Universiade bronze medalists for Chinese Taipei
Universiade medalists in badminton
Medalists at the 2011 Summer Universiade
Medalists at the 2013 Summer Universiade
Medalists at the 2015 Summer Universiade